FC Torpedo Mykolaiv is an amateur club from Mykolaiv competing at the regional competitions of Mykolaiv Oblast. The club plays its game at a stadium of Zoria-Mashproekt Factory.

Overview
The club was founded in 1955 by the Zoria-Mashproekt Factory as Avanhard Mykolaiv. In 1957 it changed its name to Torpedo Mykolaiv. Sometime in the 1980s the club ceased its operations.

It was revived once again in 2001 as Zoria-Mashproekt by Zoria-Mashproekt. In 2005 it changed its name again to Torpedo Mykolaiv.

Since 1987, in Mykolaiv exists the Specialized sports school of Olympic Reserve Torpedo Mykolaiv which provides younger footballers with training support.

Honours
Ukrainian football championship among amateurs
 Runners-up (2): 2008, 2009

Ukrainian Amateur Cup
 Finalist (2): 1963, 2007

Football championship of Mykolaiv Oblast
 Winners (12): 1958–1961, 1963, 1965, 1982, 2005, 2006, 2008, 2010, 2011
 Runners-up (5): 1964, 1973, 1979, 2007, 2012

'''Mykolaiv Oblast Football Cup
 Holders (8): 1955, 1959, 1960, 1963, 1965, 1974, 2011, 2012
 Finalists (7): 1966, 1969, 1971, 1979, 2007, 2008, 2010

Notable players
  Nikita Rukavytsya (youth)
  Illya Hulko (youth)
  Artem Umanets (youth)

Gallery

References

 
Torpedo Mykolaiv
Torpedo Mykolaiv